George Stanley Hawker (7 May 1894 – 17 February 1979) was an Australian politician who represented the South Australian House of Assembly seat of Burra from 1947 to 1956 for the Liberal and Country League.

References

1894 births
1979 deaths
Members of the South Australian House of Assembly
Liberal and Country League politicians
20th-century Australian politicians